Captain Allyn K. Capron (1871–1898) was the first United States Army officer to die in the Spanish–American War.

Before Cuba 
Allyn Kissam Capron, was the first son of Agnes and Allyn Capron. He married, enlisted as private in 1890, and rose rapidly through the ranks as:
 Private, Corporal and Sergeant, 4th U.S. Cavalry, 20 Oct 1890–1893
 Second Lieutenant, 5th U.S. Infantry, 7 Oct 1893
 Transferred to 7th Cavalry, 30 Nov 1894, became Lieutenant
 Captain. 1st U.S. Volunteer Cavalry, 10 May 1898

When the Spanish–American War broke out, Capron raised a troop of Rough Riders from the Old West (now Oklahoma) to serve as volunteer cavalry in Cuba. Theodore Roosevelt later wrote of Capron:

Battle and death 
General William R. Shafter's corps of American soldiers arrived in Cuba after the declarations of war in 1898. Capron's regiment was commanded by Colonel Leonard Wood and Lieutenant Colonel (later President) Theodore Roosevelt. Colonel Wood granted Capron's request to lead the vanguard, ordering Capron to take his advance guard up a hill at Las Guasimas.

The forward unit of Capron's troop, commanded by Sergeant Hamilton Fish II, ran into Spanish gunfire on the hill. Capron rode up and found a dead Cuban scout and Sergeant Fish lying in the middle of the road. Bringing up his troops and leading them in action, Capron lay down to fire at the Spanish soldiers and was shot through the space between the left shoulder and neck with the bullet passing through the lungs and exiting out the right area in the waist.

Brought to the rear by a Rough Rider, Capron died. He was highly praised by his commanders, including Roosevelt and was awarded a posthumous Silver Star in 1925. His widow Lillian received the decoration.

He was buried at Arlington National Cemetery in Arlington, Virginia.

References

External links 
 Allyn Kissam Capron at ArlingtonCemetery.net, an unofficial website

Recipients of the Silver Star
1871 births
1898 deaths
United States Army officers
American military personnel killed in the Spanish–American War
Burials at Arlington National Cemetery